Lee Valley Regional Park is a   long linear park, much of it green spaces, running through the northeast of Greater London, Essex and Hertfordshire from the River Thames to Ware, through areas such as Stratford, Clapton, Tottenham, Enfield, Walthamstow, Waltham Abbey, Cheshunt, Broxbourne and Hoddesdon in an area generally known as the Lea Valley. Greater London's largest park, Lee Valley Park is more than four times the size of Richmond Park, extending beyond Greater London's borders into the neighbouring counties of Hertfordshire and Essex.

The park follows the course of the River Lea (Lee) along the Lea Valley from Ware in Hertfordshire through Essex and the north east of Greater London, through the Queen Elizabeth Olympic Park to East India Docks Basin on the River Thames. It is crossed by a number of roads and railways.

There are major reservoirs and water courses (rivers and canals) within Lee Valley Park, both to carry the river flow, and provide navigable waterways and flood relief channels.

London 2012 Olympic and Paralympic Games 
From London's Olympic bid success in summer 2005 until summer 2012, much of the southern half of the Lee Valley Park was developed to form the Olympic Park for the 2012 Summer Olympics and 2012 Summer Paralympics. Lee Valley Park was extended through the Olympic Park down to the River Thames, adding a further 2 miles (3 km) of open space.

Lee Valley Regional Park Authority owns 35% of the Olympic Park. It funds, manages and owns three venues following the London 2012 Games – Lee Valley White Water Centre in Hertfordshire, Lee Valley VeloPark and the Eton Manor hockey and tennis centres located at the northernmost end of the Queen Elizabeth Olympic Park. The park is working with a range of partners including the Olympic Delivery Authority, London Development Agency and the London Thames Gateway Development Corporation to deliver a major linear park at the heart of a new urban district in the Lower Lea Valley. These venues will join the existing centres the Regional Park currently owns including Lee Valley Athletics Centre, Lee Valley Riding Centre and Lee Valley Ice Centre.

Notable parts of the park include: Myddelton House Gardens, Temple Mills, Hackney Marshes, Walthamstow Marshes, Tottenham Marshes, River Lee Country Park, Bow Creek Ecology Park and Lee Valley Reservoir Chain.

See also 
 Lea Valley Walk

Gallery

References

External links

Ramblers Association

 
Linear parks
Long-distance footpaths in England
Parks and open spaces in Essex
Parks and open spaces in Hertfordshire
Parks and open spaces in London
Walking in London